The Big Stampede is a 1932 pre-Code American Western film starring John Wayne (with his horse named "Duke") and Noah Beery. It is a remake of the 1927 film The Land Beyond the Law.

Plot
Deputy Sheriff Steele is commissioned by Governor Wallace to protect settlers in New Mexico Territory while a cattle baron (Crew) and his accomplice (Bailey) try to prevent the newcomers from settling there.

Cast
 John Wayne as Deputy Sheriff John Steele
 Noah Beery as Sam Crew
 Paul Hurst as "Arizona" Frank Bailey
 Mae Madison as Ginger Malloy
 Luis Alberni as Sonora Joe
 Berton Churchill as Governor Lew Wallace
 Sherwood Bailey as Pat Malloy
 Lafe McKee as Cal Brett
 Joseph W. Girard as Major Parker

Production notes 
Much of the footage in this film was reused from The Land Beyond the Law (1927), which starred Ken Maynard. Warner Bros. had Wayne dress in outfits that matched those worn by Maynard in the earlier film. Discrepancies occurred, however, when new footage was shot on a different location from that of the previous film.

See also
 John Wayne filmography
 List of American films of 1932

References

External links
 
 
 
 

1932 films
1932 Western (genre) films
American Western (genre) films
American black-and-white films
Remakes of American films
Films directed by Tenny Wright
Warner Bros. films
1930s English-language films
1930s American films
Films scored by Bernhard Kaun
Films set in New Mexico